A moving company, removalist or van line is a company that helps people and businesses move their goods from one place to another.  It offers all-inclusive services for relocations, like packing, loading, moving, unloading, unpacking, and arranging of items to be shifted. Additional services may include cleaning services for houses, offices or warehousing facilities.

Overview
According to the U.S. Census Bureau, 40 million United States citizens have moved annually over the last decade. Of those people who have moved in the United States, 84.5% of them have moved within their own state, 12.5% have moved to another state, and 2.3% have moved to another country.

The U.S. Department of Defense is the largest household goods shipper in the world with the Personal Property Program accounting for 20% of all moves.

In the U.S. and Canada, the cost for long-distance moves is typically determined by the weight of the items to be moved, the distance, how quickly the items are to be moved, and the time of the year or month when the move takes place. Some movers also offer consolidated shipping, which reduces costs by transporting several clients' items in the same shipment. In the United Kingdom and Australia, the price is based on the volume of the items rather than their weight. Some movers may offer flat rate pricing.

The use of truck rental services, or simply borrowing similar hardware, is referred to as DIY moving. Typically, the parties who are moving borrow or rent a truck or trailer large enough to carry their household goods and, if necessary, obtain moving equipment such as dollies, furniture pads, and cargo belts to protect the furniture or to facilitate the moving process itself.

The moving process also involves finding or buying materials such as boxes, paper, tape, and bubble wrap with which to pack boxable and/or protect fragile household goods and to consolidate the carrying and stacking on moving day. Self-service moving companies offer another viable option: the person moving buys space on one or more trailers or shipping containers. These containers are then driven by professionals to the new location.

See also 
Moving scam
Relocation service
Structure relocation
Relocation (personal)

References

External links 

Moving and relocation
 
Truck rental